Ningjiang District is a district of Songyuan, Jilin, China.

Administrative Divisions
Subdistricts:
Wenhua Subdistrict, Linjiang Subdistrict, Gongnong Subdistrict, Tuanjie Subdistrict, Minzhu Subdistrict, Qianjin Subdistrict, Heping Road Subdistrict, Shihua Subdistrict, Yanjiang Subdistrict, Fanrong Subdistrict

Towns:
Dawa, Maoduzhan

Townships:
Chaoyang Township, Xincheng Township, Xingyuan Township, Gaiyou Township, Bodu Township, Fenghua Township, Xinmin Township

References

External links

County-level divisions of Jilin